William Baylies (September 15, 1776 – September 27, 1865) was an American lawyer and politician who served four non-consecutive terms as a U.S. Representative from Massachusetts in the early to mid-19th Century.

He was the brother of congressman Francis Baylies. His great-grandfather was Thomas Baylies, an ironmaster from Coalbrookdale, England, who emigrated to Boston in 1737.

Biography 
Baylies was born in Dighton, Massachusetts, in 1776, the son of Dr. William Baylies (1743–1826). He graduated from Brown University, Providence, Rhode Island, in 1795 where he studied law.  He was admitted to the bar and commenced practice in Bridgewater (west parish) in 1799 and served as member of the State house of representatives in 1808, 1809, 1812, 1813, 1820, and 1821 and in the State Senate in 1825, 1826, 1830, and 1831.

He was elected a member of the American Antiquarian Society in 1814.

Congress 
Baylies was credentialed and seated in the 11th Congress, but the election was contested by his opponent Charles Turner Jr. Turner had won a majority of the ballots in the November 1808 election, but the Governor ruled that no one had received a majority because nearly 20% of Turner's votes had been cast for "Charles Turner" and the rest for "Charles Turner, Jr." The Governor called for a special election that Baylies won and he took the seat. But Turner successfully argued that the votes that omitted "Jr." were clearly intended for him. The special election was deemed void and on June 28 Baylies was deemed unentitled to the seat.

Baylies was then elected as a Federalist to the Thirteenth and Fourteenth Congresses (March 4, 1813 – March 3, 1817). He was elected as an Anti-Jacksonian to the Twenty-third Congress (March 4, 1833 – March 3, 1835).

Death and burial 
He died in Taunton, Massachusetts, on September 27, 1865. Interment was in Dighton Town Cemetery, Dighton, Massachusetts.

References

External links

 

1776 births
1865 deaths
People from Dighton, Massachusetts
American people of English descent
Federalist Party members of the United States House of Representatives from Massachusetts
National Republican Party members of the United States House of Representatives from Massachusetts
Members of the Massachusetts House of Representatives
Massachusetts state senators
Members of the American Antiquarian Society
Brown University alumni
Members of the United States House of Representatives removed by contest